Double Vision is a novel by Pat Barker, published in 2003. The Observer described the book as a "strongly written, oddly constructed new novel".

References

Novels by Pat Barker
Novels about war correspondents
2003 British novels
Hamish Hamilton books